1TV is an Afghan privately owned commercial television channel, launched in February 2010. It is owned by Fahim Hashimy, and is the largest operating unit of groupOne Media, which is based in Kabul.

History
1TV Kabul starts broadcasting live from Kabul in February 2010. 1TV was the most watched channel in Afghanistan since it was launched.

1TV was known for professional news broadcasts. 1TV broadcast its news at 8pm.

1TV was the first channel in Afghanistan who broadcast from the brand new virtual studios technology.

In September 2021, 1TV started broadcasting again from Germany.

Programmes on 1TV

International availability
1TV currently broadcasts to viewers in Europe, western and central Asia on TürkmenÄlem 52°E / MonacoSAT satellite, and to viewers in the Middle East on Yahsat 1A satellite. It is also available by online streaming worldwide.

See also
 Television in Afghanistan

References

External links

Television in Afghanistan
Mass media in Kabul
Television stations in Afghanistan